Darreh Mianeh-ye Sofla (also Romanized as Darreh Mīāneh-ye Soflá and Darreh Miyaneh Sofla; also known as Darreh Meyāneh-ye Pā’īn, Darreh Mīāneh, and Darreh Mīāneh-ye Pā’īn) is a village in Kamazan-e Sofla Rural District, Zand District, Malayer County, Hamadan Province, Iran. At the 2006 census, its population was 151, in 33 families.

References 

Populated places in Malayer County